The Coopersville and Marne Railway is a tourist railroad and common carrier in West Michigan.  It connects with the Grand Rapids Eastern Railroad.  The for-profit company owns the track, which runs from Walker, Michigan to Coopersville, Michigan
in Kent and Ottawa counties.
It runs excursion trains from Coopersville to Marne and back and services one customer, near the end of the line, with freight cars of lumber.

, one car on the train will be handicapped accessible in the near future.

As of 2022, the handicap-accessible car is still under restoration. No completion date has been announced.

Locomotives

Source

References

See also

 Employer determination 

Michigan railroads
Railway companies established in 1993
Heritage railroads in Michigan
Tourist attractions in Kent County, Michigan
Tourist attractions in Ottawa County, Michigan
1989 establishments in Michigan